KPIR (1420 kHz) is a commercial AM radio station in Granbury, Texas, serving Hood County.  It is owned by Jerry Reynolds, with the license held by KPIR Granbury, LLC.  It airs a classic country radio format, featuring Texas country artists.  It also carries Granbury High School football games.  Because the team is known as The Pirates, the station calls itself "Pirate 1420."

The station broadcasts at 500 watts using a directional antenna at all times.  It transmits from a three tower array in the daytime and from two towers at night.  In addition to its broadcasts, the station can be heard streaming on its website.

History
The station signed on the air in 1980 as KPAR. The station suffered financial problems and became a daytime only station in 1986. The station changed its call letters to KPIR in 2002.  The station is now a 24-hour operation.

External links
KPIR official website

 DFW Radio/TV History

Country radio stations in the United States
Radio stations established in 1980
PIR